The Fengshen E30 and Fengshen E30L is an all-electric car that is manufactured by the Chinese manufacturer Dongfeng Fengshen or Aeolus.

Overview
The Fengshen E30 was revealed in 2011 as the Dongfeng EJ02 EV. The name was changed to Dongfeng EV1 in early 2012 and was changed again to Fengshen E30 in April 2012 while on display at the Beijing Auto Show with production confirmed in 2013 and the final market launch in March 2015. The E30 is the short-wheelbase two-seater version, and the E30L is the longer four-seater version, with the E30L adding 30 centimeters to the wheelbase of the E30.

The Fengshen E30 and Fengshen E30L are both powered by an electric motor producing 34PS (25 kW), capable of an 80 km/h top speed.

References

External links
 Official Website

Production electric cars
2010s cars
Fengshen E30
Cars introduced in 2011
Cars of China